is a Japanese Renju player. He won Renju World Champion in 1995. Up to 2004, Kawamura has been the Japan's Meijin title holder for 3 years.

References 

1964 births
Living people
Japanese Renju players
Renju world champions